Chlef International Airport , also known as Aboubakr Belkaid Airport, is an airport  north of the city of Chlef, in Algeria.

The DAOI-Chlef VOR/DME (Ident: CLF) is located on the field.

During World War II, the facility was known as "Warnier Airfield".  It was a major Twelfth Air Force base of operations during the North African Campaign against the German Afrika Korps.

Airlines and destinations

See also
 List of airports in Algeria
 Transport in Algeria

References

External links

 Google Maps - Chlef

 

Airports in Algeria
Buildings and structures in Chlef Province